Four ships of the Royal Navy have borne the name HMS Gadfly:

  was a  screw gunboat launched in 1856 and broken up in 1864.
  was an  flatiron gunboat launched in 1879. She was sent to the Cape of Good Hope in April 1886 and became a coal lighter named YC 230 in 1900. She was sold in 1918.
  was a coastal destroyer launched in 1906, and renamed TB 6 later that year. She was sold in 1920.
  was a  launched in 1915 and transferred to the War Department in 1923.

Royal Navy ship names